Greya reticulata is a moth of the family Prodoxidae. It is found from the coastal range of California in the United States.

The wingspan is 9–15.5 mm. The forewings of the females are white to pale ochreous, banded with brownish spots. Males have the same ground color, but this is irrorated (speckled) with brown. The hindwings are gray, often darker in females.

The larvae feed on Osmorhiza chilensis. Young larvae feed on the developing seeds of their host plant.

References

Moths described in 1892
Prodoxidae